Sigourney Community School District  is a rural public school district headquartered in Sigourney, Iowa. The district is completely within Keokuk County and serves Sigourney, Delta, and Hayesville. It operates a preschool/elementary school and a junior/senior high school.

In 2016 the district agreed to begin a superintendent-sharing arrangement with the Pekin Community School District.

Schools
Sigourney Elementary School
Sigourney Jr.-Sr. High School

Athletics
The Savages compete in the South Iowa Cedar League Conference in the following sports:

Cross Country (boys and girls)
Volleyball (girls)
Football (boys) (jointly with Keota Community School District as Sigourney/Keota)
State Champions - 1979 (Sigourney); 1995, 2001 and 2005 (as Sigourney/Keota)
Basketball (boys and girls)
Wrestling (boys and girls)
Track and Field (boys and girls)
 Girls' Class 1A State Champions - 1990, 1991, 1992 
Golf (boys and girls)
Baseball (boys)
Softball (girls)

See also
List of school districts in Iowa
List of high schools in Iowa

References

External links
 Sigourney Community School District
 Sigourney Community School District Sigourney, Iowa Independent Auditor's Reports Basic Financial Statements and Supplementary Information Schedule of Findings and Questioned Costs." Government of Iowa. June 30, 2011.

School districts in Iowa
Education in Keokuk County, Iowa